Zarina Sitkazinova (born 20 March 1993) is a Kazakhstani female volleyball player. She is a member of the Kazakhstan women's national volleyball team and played for Zhetysu Almaty in 2011. 

She was part of the Kazakhstani national team at the 2010 FIVB Volleyball Women's World Championship in Japan, 2011 FIVB World Grand Prix in Italy, 2013 FIVB World Grand Prix and 2016 FIVB World Grand Prix.

Clubs 
  Zhetysu Almaty (2010)

References

External links 
 FIVB profile
 http://asianvolleyball.net/wp-content/uploads/2015/01/P-2-for-match-10-IRI-KAZ.pdf

1991 births
Living people
Kazakhstani women's volleyball players
Place of birth missing (living people)
People from West Kazakhstan Region